Frances Anderson may refer to:

 Judith Anderson (1897–1992), born Frances Margaret Anderson
 Frances Anderson Center, located in Edmonds, Washington
 Frances Anderson, wife of Robert Needham, 2nd Viscount Kilmorey
 Frances Anderson, Miss Arkansas 1961
 Frances Anderson, art therapist

See also
Francis Anderson (disambiguation)